"My Music at Work" is a song by Canadian rock group The Tragically Hip. It is the first single and title track from the band's seventh studio album, Music @ Work. The song was a hit in the band's native country, peaking at  2 on Canada's Rock chart.

Music video
The music video for "My Music at Work" was directed by Bruce McCulloch and filmed in the lobby of Commerce Court North, which is part of the headquarters for the Canadian bank CIBC. The video features the band performing under the pseudonym "The Filters". The band's musical performance in the video was filmed at The Opera House in Toronto on May 14, 2000.

Awards and nominations
The music video was nominated for two awards at the 2000 MuchMusic Video Awards, with McCulloch winning for "Best Director".
The video reached No. 1 on MuchMusic Countdown for two consecutive weeks between August 18 and 25.

Covers
At the WayHome Music & Arts Festival in 2016, the night after the Tragically Hip commenced their Man Machine Poem Tour, Arkells included a version of the song in their set.

Charts

References

External links

2000 singles
The Tragically Hip songs
2000 songs
Universal Records singles
Songs about music